Peter Nguyen may refer to:

Peter Nguyen (judge) (1943–2020), the first Director of Public Prosecution of Asian descent in Hong Kong history
Peter Nguyen Van Hung (born 1958), Vietnamese Australian Roman Catholic priest and human rights activist

See also
Pierre Nguyen (disambiguation)